is an American former professional basketball player and current coach. Previously he was Head coach of the Osaka Evessa and Gunma Crane Thunders in the Japanese Bj League.

College Career
Blackwell started his college career at the University of Illinois in 1995–1996. He appeared in 30 games his Freshmen season before transferring to Syracuse and sitting out the 1996–1997 season due to transfer protocols. Blackwell debut for Syracuse in the 1997–1998 season. In three years at Syracuse Blackwell started every game for the Orange averaging 11.8 points, 7.8 rebounds and 2.6 assists per game and helping to lead the Orange to three straight NCAA Tournament appearances and two Sweet 16 appearance (1998 and 2000)

Blackwell is best remembered by Syracuse fans for making the game winning, buzzer beating shot, in overtime, against St. John's in the 1998 Big East Tournament. The 69–67 win sent the Orange to Big East Championship game where they would fall to Connecticut 69–64.

Head coaching record

|-
| style="text-align:left;"|Osaka Evessa
| style="text-align:left;"|2010–11
| 50||32||18|||| style="text-align:center;"|2nd in Western|||4||3||1||
| style="text-align:center;"|3rd place 
|- 
| style="text-align:left;"|Osaka Evessa
| style="text-align:left;"|2011–12
| 52||35||17|||| style="text-align:center;"|2nd in Western|||3||1||2||
| style="text-align:center;"|Lost in 2nd round 
|- 
| style="text-align:left;"|Gunma Crane Thunders
| style="text-align:left;"|2012–13
| 44||14||30|||| style="text-align:center;"|11th in Eastern|||-||-||-||
| style="text-align:center;"|- 
|- 
| style="text-align:left;"|Gunma Crane Thunders
| style="text-align:left;"|2013
| 20||3||17|||| style="text-align:center;"|Fired|||-||-||-||
| style="text-align:center;"|- 
|-

References

1976 births
Living people
Gunma Crane Thunders coaches
Osaka Evessa coaches
Osaka Evessa players
Reims Champagne Basket players
Sendai 89ers players
Syracuse Orange men's basketball players
American men's basketball players